Bence Halász (born 4 August 1997) is a Hungarian athlete specialising in the hammer throw. He won the bronze medal at the 2019 World Championships. In addition, he won gold medals at the 2017 European U23 Championships and 2016 World U20 Championships. In 2018 he won a bronze medal at the European Championships in Berlin.

His personal best in the event is 80.92 m set at the 2022 European Championships. Early in his career, he also competed in the discus throw.

International competitions

References

External links

1997 births
Living people
Hungarian male hammer throwers
World Athletics Championships athletes for Hungary
World Athletics Championships medalists
Athletes (track and field) at the 2014 Summer Youth Olympics
People from Kiskunhalas
Hungarian Athletics Championships winners
Competitors at the 2017 Summer Universiade
Athletes (track and field) at the 2020 Summer Olympics
Olympic athletes of Hungary
Sportspeople from Bács-Kiskun County
20th-century Hungarian people
21st-century Hungarian people
European Athletics Championships medalists